Nijlande is a hamlet in the Dutch province of Drenthe. It is a part of the municipality of Aa en Hunze, and lies about 6 km southeast of Assen. The area "Nijlande", which also includes the nearby countryside, has a population of around 60.

The hamlet was first mentioned in 1634 as Nyelande, and means "new land". Nijlande is an esdorp which developed on cultivated land as a satellite of Rolde. Nijlande was home to 51 people in 1840.

Gallery

References

Populated places in Drenthe
Aa en Hunze